Chikkamadu S was an Indian Politician from the state of Karnataka. He was a member of the Karnataka Legislative Assembly.

Constituency
He represented the Heggadadevankote constituency. He died on 1 November 2017 in Mysore due to liver cancer.

Political Party
He was from the Janata Dal (Secular).

References 

1951 births
Living people
People from Mysore district
Janata Dal (Secular) politicians
Karnataka MLAs 1989–1994
Karnataka MLAs 2013–2018